The New Year Honours 1894 were appointments by Queen Victoria to various orders and honours to reward and highlight good works by members of the British Empire. They were published in The Times on 1 January 1984 and in The London Gazette on 2 January 1894.

The recipients of honours are displayed here as they were styled before their new honour, and arranged by honour, with classes (Knight, Knight Grand Cross, etc.) and then divisions (Military, Civil, etc.) as appropriate.

Baronetcies
Leonard Lyell  
Theodore Fry

Knighthoods
Thomas Roe  
Donald Horne Macfarlane  
Robert Hunter, Solicitor to the Post Office.

Colonial list
Fielding Clarke, Chief Justice of Hong Kong
John Winfield Bonser, Chief Justice of Ceylon
Hartley Williams, Senior Puisne Judge of the Supreme Court of Victoria
William Patrick Manning, Mayor of Sydney

Victoria Cross (VC)
Surgeon-Major Owen Edward Pennefather Lloyd

Order of the Bath

Knights Grand Cross (GCB)
Civil division
Abdul Rahman Khan, Amir of Afghanistan

Knights Commander (KCB)
Civil division
Sir Thomas Henry Sanderson   Assistant Under Secretary of State, Foreign Office.
The Hon. Robert Meade   Permanent Under-Secretary of State for the Colonies

Companions (CB)
Military division
Colonel Edmond Roche Elles, Assistant Quartermaster-General (Intelligence Branch), Headquarters India

Civil division
William James Colville, Colonel in the Army (Retired List)
Cornelius Neale Dalton   Assistant-Secretary to the Local Government Board
Charles E. Gifford, Secretary to the Commander-in-Chief at Portsmouth
 J. Norman Lockyer   Professor of Astronomy in the Royal College of Science
William Henry Preece, Engineer-in-Chief to the General Post Office

Order of the Star of India

Knights Commander (KCSI)
Sir Henry Mortimer Durand   Secretary to the Government of India in the Foreign Department

Companions (CSI)
Richard Udny, Commissioner and Superintendent, Peshawur Division
Jervoise Athelstane Baines, Member of the Indian Civil Service
William John Cuningham, Deputy Secretary and Acting Secretary to the Government of India in the Foreign Department
Thomas Salter Pyne

Order of the Indian Empire

Knights Commander (KCIE)
The Maharao Raja of Bundi
The Maharaja of Karauli
The Maharaja of Orchha
Prince Jehan Kader Mirza Bahadur, of Oudh
Colonel John Charles Ardagh   Private Secretary to His Excellency the Viceroy
Colonel Lord William Leslie de la Poer Beresford   Military Secretary to His Excellency the Viceroy.
James Lyle Mackay

Companions (CIE)
Pherozeshah Merwanji Mehta, Additional Member of the Council of the Governor-General of India
William Robert Brooke, Director-General of Telegraphs in India
Paul Gregory Melitus, Deputy Secretary to the Government of India in the Home Department
Lieutenant-Colonel George Montgomery Moore, RA, Retired, President of the Madras Municipal Commission
Surgeon-Major Ernest Harrold Fenn
Major Richard Carnac Temple, Indian Staff Corps.
Major John William Hogge, Indian Staff Corps
Edward Claudius Scotney George, Officiating Deputy Commissioner of the Bhamo District
Robert William Edward Hampe Vincent, Acting Commissioner of Police, Bombay
Lieutenant Arthur Henry McMahon, Indian Staff Corps.
Lieutenant John Manners Smith  Indian Staff Corps
John Stuart Donald, Assistant-Commissioner, Punjab.
Rai Bahadur Bankim Chunder Chatterjee.

Order of St Michael and St George

Knights Commander
Neale Porter  Colonial Secretary of the Island of Jamaica
Jenkin Coles, Speaker of the House of Assembly of the Colony of South Australia
Westby Perceval, Agent-General in London for the Colony of New Zealand

Companions (CMG)
Captain Edward Henry Meggs Davis  For services connected with certain islands in the Western Pacific.
John Edward Tanner  late Director of Public Works and General Superintendent of Railways in the Island of Trinidad.
Frederick William Webb, Clerk of the Legislative Assembly of the Colony of New South Wales
Godfrey Yeatman Lagden, Government Secretary and Accountant of Basutoland.
George Edward Yorke Gleadowe, of Her Majesty's Treasury, for services connected with the award of compensation to British Sealers excluded from Behring Sea, under the modus vivendi with the United States of 1891.
(Honorary) Tungu Mohamed bin Antah, Yam Tuan Besar of Sri Menanti, President of the State Council of the Negri Sembilan Confederated States

Distinguished Service Order (DSO)
Captain Gordon Napier Caulfeild, Indian Staff Corps
Captain Hugh Neufville Taylor, Indian Staff Corps
Lieutenant John Henegan, Indian Staff Corps

References

New Year Honours
1894 in the United Kingdom
1894 awards